János Stiller (born 6 June 1946, in Budapest) is a Hungarian former handball player.

In 1972 he was part of the Hungarian team which finished eighth in the Olympic tournament. He played all six matches and scored eleven goals.

Stiller also participated on two World Championships in 1970 and 1974, finishing eighth and seventh respectively.

Awards
 Hungarian Handballer of the Year: 1972

References

1946 births
Living people
Handball players from Budapest
Hungarian male handball players
Olympic handball players of Hungary
Handball players at the 1972 Summer Olympics